The Saeki (佐伯) were a people of ancient Japan, believed to have lived on Honshū in the area between the modern regions of Kantō and Hokuriku during the Jōmon period.

References

Tribes of ancient Japan